Paynter is a surname. It can either be of British origin, meaning "the head/end of the land" (penn an tir) in the Cornish language, or it can be of English-language origin, where it is occupational and refers to a painter.  It may refer to:

Billy Paynter (born 1984), British football player
Charlie Paynter (1879–1971), British football manager
David Paynter (artist) (1900–1975), Sri Lankan artist
Eddie Paynter (1901–1979), British cricketer
Henry Paynter (1923–2002), American scientist
Hilary Paynter (born 1943), British artist
Julian Paynter (born 1970), Australian athlete
James Paynter (born 1666), leader of a Jacobite uprising
John Paynter (disambiguation), multiple people
Kent Paynter (born 1965), Canadian ice hockey player
Lemuel Paynter (1788–1863), American politician
Noel Stephen Paynter (1898–1998), British air commodore
Michael Paynter (born 1986), Australian singer-songwriter
Mick Paynter (born 1948), British writer
Randy Paynter (born 1963), American businessman
Raymond Andrew Paynter, Jr., American ornithologist
Robert Paynter (1928–2010), British cinematographer
Samuel Paynter (1768–1845), American politician
Susan Paynter (born 1945), American journalist
Thomas H. Paynter (1851–1921), American politician
Will Paynter (1903–1984), British union leader
William Paynter (academic) (1637–1716), British priest
William Henry Paynter (1901–1976), British historian

See also
Paynter (horse), Thoroughbred racehorse
Painter (surname)

References

Cornish-language surnames
Surnames of British Isles origin
English-language surnames
Occupational surnames
English-language occupational surnames